La Grosse Décharge Est is a tributary of the north shore of La Grosse Décharge Ouest, flowing entirely in the town of Baie-Saint-Paul, in the Charlevoix Regional County Municipality, in the administrative region of Capitale-Nationale, in the province of Quebec, in Canada.

This valley is mainly served by secondary forest roads which connect to the Chemin du Séminaire which runs along the south side of La Grosse Décharge Ouest. Forestry is the main economic activity in this valley; recreational tourism, second.

The surface of La Grosse Décharge Est is generally frozen from the beginning of December until the beginning of April; however, safe circulation on the ice is generally done from mid-December to the end of March. The water level of the river varies with the seasons and the precipitation; the spring flood generally occurs in April.

Geography 
The Big East Discharge originates at the mouth of a very small lake (length: a hundred meters;). The mouth of this lake is located at:
  East of the Baie-Saint-Paul boundary and the unorganized territory of Lac-Jacques-Cartier;
  east of the course of the Sainte-Anne River;
  west of the mouth of the rivière des Mares (confluence with the Rivière du Gouffre);
  west of downtown Baie-Saint-Paul.

  south-east down the mountain in a deep valley crossing a small lake in the middle of the segment, to a stream (from the north);
  first by forming a hook towards the south, then towards the south-east in a deep valley, until its mouth.

La Grosse Décharge Est drains onto the north shore of La Grosse Décharge Ouest in Baie-Saint-Paul. This mouth is located at:
  north-east of the forest road;
  north-west of the village center of Saint-Placide-Nord
  west of downtown Baie-Saint-Paul;
  north-west of the confluence of the Gouffre river and the Saint Lawrence River.

Toponymy 
This toponymic designation appears on the map "Domaine forestier du Séminaire de Québec", 1955-01.

The toponym "La Grosse Décharge Est" was formalized on March 25, 1997 at the Place Names Bank of the Commission de toponymie du Québec.

Notes and references

Appendices

Related articles 
 Charlevoix Regional County Municipality
 Baie-Saint-Paul, a city
 La Grosse Décharge Ouest
 Rivière des Mares (Gouffre River tributary)
 Rivière du Gouffre
 St. Lawrence River
 List of rivers of Quebec

External links 

Rivers of Capitale-Nationale
Charlevoix Regional County Municipality